Life with Henry is a 1941 American comedy film directed by Theodore Reed and written by Clifford Goldsmith and Don Hartman. The film stars Jackie Cooper, Leila Ernst, Eddie Bracken, Fred Niblo, Hedda Hopper and Kay Stewart. The film was released on January 24, 1941, by Paramount Pictures.

Plot
Henry Aldrich needs to raise 100 dollars to win a trip to Alaska, so he decides to start raising money by making and selling soap with his friend Dizzy. This turns out to be a disaster and Henry has to find another way to win the trip.

Cast

Reception
Bosley Crowther of The New York Times characterized the film as "pleasant family entertainment".

References

External links 
 

1941 films
The Aldrich Family films
American black-and-white films
Paramount Pictures films
American comedy films
1941 comedy films
Films directed by Theodore Reed
Films scored by Friedrich Hollaender
1940s English-language films
1940s American films